Kerr Hewitt, also credited professionally as Kjartan Hewitt, is a Canadian actor and writer. He won the Best Actor award at the Sicily Web Festival for his performance in the YouTube web series Clusterfuck (2018).

Career

Acting 

Hewitt began working in the entertainment industry as a teenager, on television series for the CBC and YTV. When he was 17, he began writing plays and musicals. He then went on to study a BA in English literature. He made an appearance in Edgar Wright's Scott Pilgrim vs. the World (2010) as Jimmy. Jimmy was the boyfriend of Scott Pilgrim's sister before being seduced by Pilgrim's roommate Wallace at a "Crash and the Boys" (a fictional version of Toronto band Broken Social Scene) concert and appearing in recurring gags with Wallace. Hewitt starred in a larger role in another feature film in 2010, This Movie Is Broken, playing Blake, the best friend of a young Toronto man who tries to impress a girl by taking her to a Broken Social Scene concert with them. The concert in the film was the real 2009 Harbourfront Centre concert, around which part of the plot revolves.

In 2018, he starred in the YouTube web series Clusterfuck, which follows the lives of millennials in downtown Toronto. Hewitt won the Best Actor award for his role at the Sicily Web Festival, where the series was given a premiere,.

Hewitt has starred most prominently in works with a strong Toronto identity: Scott Pilgrim vs. the World, This Movie Is Broken, and Clusterfuck.

Writing
He studied the Features program at Canadian Film Centre, turning one of his old plays – Claire, From the Bus – into a film and completing the course in 2017 at the age of 30. Claire, From the Bus had debuted on the Toronto theatre circuit in 2013, starring Bryn McAuley as Claire, with positive reception for Hewitt's writing. The film, directed by Jordan Canning, was released in 2016.

Filmography

Film

Television

References

External links

Kerr Hewitt and Kjartan Hewitt on Rotten Tomatoes
Kerr Hewitt and Kjartan Hewitt at the BFI
Kerr Hewitt at Northern Stars.ca

21st-century Canadian male actors
21st-century Canadian male writers